John Ralph Leach (12 May 1866 – 1931) was an English footballer who played in the Football League for Darwen.

References

1866 births
1931 deaths
English footballers
Darwen F.C. players
English Football League players
Association football defenders